Milburn is an unincorporated farming and ranching community established in 1873 in the county of McCulloch, in the U.S. state of Texas.  It is the birthplace of the former boxer Lew Jenkins.

References

Towns in McCulloch County, Texas
Unincorporated communities in Texas